We Shall Remain (2009) is a five-part, 7.5-hour documentary series about the history of Native Americans in the United States, from the 17th century into the 20th century. It was a collaborative effort with several different directors, writers and producers working on each episode, including directors Chris Eyre, Ric Burns and Stanley Nelson Jr. Actor Benjamin Bratt narrated the entire series. It is part of the PBS American Experience series and premiered on April 13, 2009.

Episode list

References

External links

American Experience
Documentary films about Native Americans
War of 1812 films
Films directed by Ric Burns
Films directed by Chris Eyre
Films directed by Stanley Nelson Jr.
2009 American television series debuts
2009 American television series endings